Statistics of Allsvenskan in season 1966.

Overview
The league was contested by 12 teams, with Djurgårdens IF Fotboll winning the championship.

League table

Results

Footnotes

References 

Allsvenskan seasons
1
Sweden
Sweden